The Office of Emergency Management (OEM) is a Division in the City of Toronto responsible for emergency co-ordination for the municipal government in Toronto, Ontario, Canada. Its goal is to "respond and reduce the impact of a public emergency and restore the municipality to a normal state as soon as possible". The OEM is governed by the provincial Emergency Management and Civil Protection Act, which mandates that every municipality in Ontario have an emergency management program.

History 
The OEM was created in 1998 and succeeded a number of other emergency operations teams that existed prior to the amalgamation of Toronto with its suburbs:

 Metropolitan Toronto Civil Defence Organization 1955
 Metropolitan Toronto Emergency Measures Organization (EMO) 1961
 EMO and City of Toronto Public Health Department staff redeployed to new Department of Emergency Services; later as Metropolitan Toronto Emergency Services 1966
 MTES disbanded 1974-1975
 Metro Toronto Police forms Emergency Planning Unit 1976
 EPU and Public Order Unit merged to form Toronto Police Service Public Safety Unit, Emergency Management Section 1996-1997
 Works and Emergency Services Department established Emergency Planning Office 1998-1999
 PSU-EMS transferred to EPO 2000

Operations 
The OEM's Emergency Operations Centre is based in the Don Mills district of Toronto. It was used during the September 11 attacks in the United States in 2001, the SARS crisis, the blackout in 2003 and as part of the City's response to the COVID-19 pandemic.

The OEM works with other emergency services units in the city, as well as City Divisions and external partners. These partners are described in a number of Emergency Support Functions (ESF) which are supporting documents to the Emergency Plan. They contain the structure and framework for integrated support by lead and supporting agencies to respond to emergencies. There are also a number of risk-specific plans, including the following:

Flood Specific plan
Nuclear Plan
Power Disruption (Electricity)

Leadership 
The OEM operates under the overall leadership of the Director - Office of Emergency Management Joanna Beaven-Desjardins. The previous permanent Director, Charles Jansed was terminated during the COVID-19 outbreak. Prior to Jansen, James Kilgour was the director of the OEM from January 2018 to April 2019.

Prior to Kilgour, Loretta Chandler was the director. Prior to Chandler, Warren Leonard was the manager of the Office of Emergency Management. Prior to Leonard, Kevin Roche led the office.

See also
 Emergency Management Ontario
 Public Safety Canada Government Operations Centre
 CANALERT

References

External links

Official Twitter

Emergency management in Canada
Municipal government of Toronto